Cameron Frederick Bender (born November 20, 1974) is an American actor.

Career
Bender is known for playing the role of Chilton Chivers in Goodnight Burbank and Richard in Mistresses.
He also appeared on the sitcom Rules of Engagement'' as Rick.

References

External links
 

1974 births
Living people
20th-century American male actors
21st-century American male actors
American male film actors
American male television actors
People from Midland, Michigan
Male actors from Michigan